David Stanislaus Clohessy (13 November 1905 – 16 November 1986) was an Irish hurler who played for his local club Fedamore and at senior level for the Limerick county team in the 1920s and 1930s. In the 1934 All-Ireland final replay, he scored four goals against Dublin, a record that lasted beyond his death.

His brothers, Paddy, Andy and Jack, who predeceased him, also played for Fedamore. Paddy Clohessy later entered politics and was elected to Dáil Éireann as a Fianna Fáil Teachta Dála (TD) at the 1957 general election and held his seat until standing down at the 1969 general election.

References

1905 births
1986 deaths
All-Ireland Senior Hurling Championship winners
Fedamore hurlers
Limerick inter-county hurlers
Munster inter-provincial hurlers